The 1999 British motorcycle Grand Prix was the eighth round of the 1999 Grand Prix motorcycle racing season. It took place on 4 July 1999 at Donington Park.

500 cc classification

250 cc classification

125 cc classification

Championship standings after the race (500cc)

Below are the standings for the top five riders and constructors after round eight has concluded.

Riders' Championship standings

Constructors' Championship standings

 Note: Only the top five positions are included for both sets of standings.

References

1999
1999 MotoGP race reports
1999 in British motorsport
July 1999 sports events in the United Kingdom